Minus refers to the minus sign, a mathematical symbol.

Minus may also refer to:

 Minus (record label) (also "m_nus"), a Canadian record label
 minus (webcomic), a webcomic
 Mínus, an Icelandic band
 Minus (album), a 2008 album by Dukes of Windsor
 "Minus", a 1996 song by Beck from Odelay
 "Minus", a 2002 song by In Flames from Reroute to Remain
 Ray Minus (born 1964), a Bahamian boxer of the 1980s, 1990s, and 2000s

See also 
 Subtraction, a mathematical operation represented by the minus sign